NUMT, pronounced "new might", is an acronym for "nuclear mitochondrial DNA" segment coined by evolutionary geneticist, Jose V. Lopez, which describes a transposition of any type of cytoplasmic mitochondrial DNA into the nuclear genome of eukaryotic organisms.

More and more NUMT sequences, with different size and length, in the diverse number of Eukaryotes, have been detected as more whole genome sequencing of different organisms accumulates. In fact, NUMTs have often been unintentionally discovered by researchers who were looking for mtDNA (mitochondrial DNA). NUMTs have been reported in all studied eukaryotes, and nearly all mitochondrial genome regions can be integrated into the nuclear genome. However, NUMTs differ in number and size across different species. Such differences may be accounted for by interspecific variation in such factors as germline stability and mitochondria number.
After the release of the mtDNA to the cytoplasm, due to the mitochondrial alteration and morphological changes, mtDNA is transferred into the nucleus by one of the various predicted methods and are eventually inserted by double-stranded break repair processes into the nuclear DNA (nDNA). Not only has any correlation been found between the fraction of noncoding DNA and NUMT abundance in the genome but NUMTs are also proven to have non-random distribution and a higher likelihood of being inserted in the certain location of genome compare to others. Depending on the location of the insertion, NUMTs might perturb the function of the genes. In addition, De novo integration of NUMT pseudogenes into the nuclear genome has an adverse effect in some cases, promoting various disorders and aging.

The first application of the NUMT term in the domestic cat (Felis catus) example was striking, since mitochondrial gene number and content were amplified 38-76X in the cat nuclear genome, besides being transposed from the cytoplasm. The cat NUMTs sequences did not appear to be functional due to the finding of multiple mutations, the differences in mitochondrial and nuclear genetic codes, and the apparent insertion within typically inert centromere regions. The presence of NUMT fragments in the genome is not problematic in all species; for instance, it is shown that sequences of mitochondrial origin promote nuclear DNA replication in Saccharomyces cerevisiae. Although, the extended translocation of mtDNA fragments and their co-amplification with free mitochondrial DNA has been problematic in the diagnosis of mitochondrial disorders, in the study of population genetics, and phylogenetic analyses, scientists have used NUMTs as the genetic markers to figure out the relative rate of nuclear and mitochondrial mutation and recreating the evolutionary tree.

In 2022, scientists reported the discovery of ongoing transfer of mitochondrial DNA into DNA in the cell nucleus. Previously, NUMT were thought to have arisen . 66 thousand whole-genome sequences indicate this currently occurs as frequent as once in every ~4,000 human births.

History
By the endosymbiosis theory, which gained acceptance around the 1970s, the mitochondrion, as a major energy factory of the cell, was previously a free-living prokaryote that invaded a eukaryotic cell. Under this theory, symbiotic organelles gradually transferred their genes to the eukaryotic genome, implying that mtDNA was gradually integrated into the nuclear genome. Despite the metabolic alterations and functional adaptations in the host eukaryotes, circular mitochondrial DNA is contained within the organelles. Containing 37 genes, mitochondrial DNA has an essential role in the production of necessary compounds, such as required enzymes for the proper function of mitochondria. Specifically, it has been suggested that certain genes (such as the genes for cytochrome oxidase subunits I and II) within the organelle are necessary to regulate redox balance throughout membrane-associated electron transport chains. These parts of the mitochondrial genome have been reported to be the most frequently employed. Mitochondria is not the only location within which the cell mtDNA, mitochondrial DNA, can be found; sometimes transfer of mitochondrial DNA from organelles to the nucleus can occur; the evidence of such translocation has been seen through the comparison of mitochondrial DNA sequence with the genome sequence of the counterparts. The integration and recombination of cytoplasmic mtDNA into the nuclear DNA is called nuclear mitochondrial DNA, which is abbreviated as NUMT.

The possible presence of organelle DNA inside the nuclear genome was suggested after finding of homologous structure to the mitochondrial DNA, which was shortly after the discovery of the presence of an independent DNA within the organelles in 1967. This topic stayed untouched until the 1980s. Initial evidence that DNA could move among cell compartments came when fragments of chloroplast DNA were found in the maize mitochondrial genome with the help of cross-hybridization, between chloroplast and mitochondrial DNA, and physical mapping of homologous regions. After this initial observation, Ellis coined the name "promiscuous DNA" in order to signify the transfer of DNA intracellularly from one organelle to the other and is the presence of organelle DNA in multiple cellular compartments. This is not only an important discovery on its own, but is also highly informative and helpful for understanding the evolutionary process and the time period different occurrence might take place. The searching for mtDNA in nuclear DNA continued until 1994 when the recent remarkable transposition of 7.9 kb of a typically 17.0-kb mitochondrial genome to a specific nuclear chromosomal position in the domestic cat was reported. This is the time that NUMT was coined to designate the large stretches of mitochondrial DNA in the genome.

Up to now, the whole genomes of many eukaryotes, both vertebrate, and invertebrate, have been sequenced and NUMT was observed in the nuclear genome of various organisms, including yeast, Podospora, sea urchin, locust, honey bee, Tribolium, rat, maize, rice, and primates. In Plasmodium, Anopheles gambiae, and Aedes aegypti mosquitoes NUMT can barely be detected. In contrast, the conserved fragments of NUMT have now few were identified in genome data for Ciona intestinalis, Neurospora crassa, Schizosaccharomyces pombe, Caenorhabditis elegans, Drosophila melanogaster, and Rattus norvegicus. Antunes and Ramos were found the presence of NUMT in the fish genome for the first time in 2005 using of BLASTN, MAFFT, very vigorous genome mappings, and phylogenic analysis. Across the animal kingdom, Apis mellifera, from phylum Arthropoda, and Hydra magnipapillata, from phylum Cnidaria, are respectively the first and second animals with the highest ratio of NUMTs to the total size of the nuclear genome while Monodelphis Domestica, or Gray short-tailed opossum, is the record holder for NUMT frequency among vertebrates. Similar to animals, NUMTs are abundant in the plants and the longest NUMT fragment known so far, a 620-kb partially duplicated insertion of the 367-kb mtDNA of Arabidopsis thaliana, was reported.

Mechanism of NUMT insertion
NUMT insertion into the nuclear genome and its persistence in the nuclear genome initiated by physical delivery of mitochondrial DNA to the nucleus. This step follows by the mtDNA integration into the genome through a non-homologous end joining mechanism during double-strand break (DSB) repair process as envisioned by studying baker's yeast, Saccharomyces Cerevisiae; and terminates by intragenomic dynamics of amplification, mutation, or deletion, which also known as post-insertion modifications. The mechanism of mtDNA transfer into nucleus is not yet fully understood.

Transfer of the released mtDNA into the nucleus
The first step in the transferring process is the release of mtDNA into the cytoplasm. Thorsness and Fox demonstrated the rate of relocation of mtDNA from mitochondria into the nucleus using ura3- yeast strain with an engineered URA3 plasmid, required gene for uracil biosynthesis, in the mitochondria. During the propagation of such yeast strains carrying a nuclear ura3 mutation, plasmid DNA that escapes from the mitochondrion to the nucleus, complements the uracil biosynthetic defect, restoring growth in the absence of uracil, and easily scored phenotype. The rate of DNA transfer from the mitochondria to the nucleus was estimated as 2 x 10-5 per cell per generation while the opposite, in the case of cox2 mutant, the rate of the transfer of plasmid from the nucleus to the mitochondria is apparently at least 100,000 times less. Many factors control the rate of mtDNA escapes from mitochondria to the nucleus. The higher rate of mutation in mtDNA in comparison with nDNA in the cells of many organisms is an important factor promoting the transfer of mitochondrial genes into the nuclear genome. One of the intergenic factors results in the higher destruction rate of mitochondrial macromolecules, including mtDNA, is the presence of high level of reactive oxygen species (ROS), generated in mitochondria as the by-products in ATP synthesis mechanism. Some other factors influencing the escape of mtDNA from mitochondria include the action of mutagenic agents and other forms of cellular stress that can damage mitochondria or their membranes, which proves that is possible to assume that exogenous damaging agents (ionizing radiation and chemical genotoxic agents) increase the rate of mtDNA escape into the cytoplasm.  Thorsness and Fox continued their research to find the endogenous factors affecting mtDNA escape into the nucleus. They isolated and studied 21 nuclear mutants with different combinations of mutations in at least 12 nuclear loci called the yme (yeast mitochondrial escape) mutations, in different environmental conditions since some of these mutations cause temperature sensitivity. They found out these mutations which perturb mitochondrial functions, due to the alteration of gene products, affect mitochondrial integrity and led to mtDNA escape to the cytoplasm. Additionally, defects in the proteins change the rate of mtDNA transfer into the nucleus. For instance, in the case of yme1 mutant, abnormal mitochondria are targeted for degradation by the vacuole, with the help of pep4, a major proteinase, and degradation increases mtDNA escape to the nucleus through the process of mitophagy. In addition, Thorsness and Campbell found that by disruption of pep4, the frequency of mtDNA escape in yme1 strains decreases. Similarly, the disruption of PRC1, which encodes carboxypeptidase Y, lowers the rate of mtDNA escape in yme1 yeast.
 Evidence shows that mitophagy is one of the possible ways for mtDNA transfer into the nucleus and determined to be the most supported pathway up to now. Some other possible pathways are shown in figure 1. The first pathway, as it was explained, is a yme1mutant that results in inactivation of YMe1p protein, a mitochondrial-localized ATP-dependent metalloproteinase, leading to high escape rate of mtDNA to the nucleus. Mitochondria of yme1 strain are taken up for degradation by the vacuole more frequently than the wild-type strain. Moreover, cytological investigations have suggested several other possible pathways in the diverse number of species, including a lysis of the mitochondrial compartment, direct physical connection and membrane fusion between mitochondria and nucleus, and encapsulation of mitochondrial compartments inside the nucleus, as shown in figure 1.
Pre-insertion preparation
After reaching the nucleus, mtDNA has to enter the nuclear genome. The rate of mtDNA incorporation into the nuclear genome can be expected to depend on the DSB number in nDNA, the activity of DSB repair systems, and the rate of mtDNA escape from organelles. MtDNA insertion comprises three main processes, shown in figure 2; first, the mtDNA has to have the proper form and sequence; in other words, the mtDNA has to be edited which gives a rise to the new edited site in the polynucleotide structure. Mitochondrial DNA is not universal and, in animals similar to plants, mitochondrial editing shows very erratic patterns of taxon-specific occurrence.
As shown in figure 2, there are three possible ways that mtDNA can become prepared to be inserted into the nuclear DNA. The process mainly depends on the time mtDNA transfers into the nucleus.  As shown in figure 2b, direct integration of unedited mtDNA fragments into the nuclear genomes is the most plausible and the evidence both found in plants, Arabidopsis genome, and animals with the help of different methods, including BLAST-based analysis. In this case, mtDNA is transferred into the nucleus whereby editing and introns arise in the mitochondrion later. If a gene, for instance, was transferred to the nucleus in one lineage before mitochondrial editing evolved, but remained in the organelle in other lineages where editing arose, the nuclear copy would appear more similar to an edited transcript than to the remaining mitochondrial copies at the edited sites. Another represented and less supported model, figure 2a, is the cDNA-mediated model, which intron-contained mtDNA enters the nucleus and by reverse transcription of spliced and edited mitochondrial transcript, it becomes integrated into the nDNA. The third proposed mechanism is the direct transfer and integration of intronless mtDNA into the nucleus, figure 2c, whereby editing and introns in the mitochondrion come and go during evolution. In this case, the introduction and removal of the intron, as well as, reverse transcription occur within mitochondria and the final product, the edited intronless mtDNA, will integrate into nDNA after being transferred into the nucleus.
Insertion into the nuclear genome
After the preparatory step is over, mtDNA is ready to be inserted into the nuclear genome. Based on NUMT integration site and the analyzed obtained results from baker's yeast experiment, Blanchard and Schmidt hypothesized that mtDNA are inserted into the double-stranded break (DSB) via non-homologous end joining machinery. The hypothesis is found to be widely accepted.  Later analyses were consistent with the involvement of NHEJ in NUMT integration in humans. These processes occur in both somatic and germline cells. In animals and humans, however, the capability of DSB repair in germline cells depends on the oogenetic and spermatogenetic stage, nonetheless, due to the low repair activity, mature sperms are incapable of DSB repair. Additionally, DSB can also be repaired by homologous recombination (HR), which is more accurate and introduces fewer errors in the process of repair, while, has not yet seen in the process of mtDNA insertion;. Apart from canonical NHEJ, DSBs are repaired via a mechanism that involves sequences containing a few homologous nucleotides at the ends of a DSB to be ligated. This mechanism is known as microhomology-mediated end joining abbreviated as MMEJ. MMEJ is the most mutagenic DSB repair mechanism due to generating deletions, insertion of various sizes, and other genome rearrangements in mammalians.
As shown in figure 3, the processes of mtDNA insertion and DSB repair include few steps which are DNA segment alignment, DNA end-processing, DNA synthesis, and ligation. In each step, certain protein complexes are required to facilitate the occurrence of the indicated events. As shown in figure 3, in NHEJ, the Ku70/Ku80 heterodimer and DNA-dependent protein kinase (DNA-PK), for bringing DNA fragments end together, the Artemis nuclease and polynucleotide kinase 3' phosphatase  (PNKP) , for the end processing, X family DNA polymerases  (Pol μ and Pol λ)  and terminal deoxynucleotidyl transferase  (TdT) , for DNA synthesis, and XLF/XRCC4/LigIV  complex, for completing the repair and joining the ends via a phosphodiester bond, are the protein complexes involved in DSB repair process in many higher organisms. DNA polymerases  (Pol μ and Pol λ)  and XLF/XRCC4/LigIV complex are shared between two NHEJ and MMEJ repair machinery and have the same responsibility in both repair processes. The first step of MMEJ is done by WRN , Artemis, DNA-PK , and XRCC4 protein complexes which process the ends of DSB and mtDNA fragments in addition to aligning them in order for polymerases and ligases to be able to complete NUMT insertion (figure 3).
Post-insertion modificationThe complex pattern of NUMT in comparison with the single mitochondrial piece, the appearance of non-continuous mitochondrial DNA in the nuclear genome, and possibly, different orientation of these fragments are the evidence of post-insertion processes of NUMT within the nuclear genome. The causation of these complex patterns might be the result of multiple NUMT insertions at insertional hotspots. In addition, duplication after insertion contributes to NUMT diversity. NUMTs have no self-replicating mechanism or transposition mechanism; therefore, NUMT duplication is expected to occur in tandem or to involve larger segmental duplication at rates representative of the rest of the genome.  Evidence for NUMT duplications that are not in proximity to other NUMTs is present in many genomes and probably happens as part of segmental duplication. However, duplications of recent human-specific NUMTs as part of segmental duplication seem to be rare; in humans, only a few NUMTs are found to have overlap with segmental duplication, and those NUMTs were found in only one of the copies while missing from the others, clearly demonstrating that the NUMTs were inserted subsequent to the duplication events. Deletion is another NUMT post-insertional modification method that has not yet been studied in the same amount of detail as an insertion. Constant erosion of phylogenic signals and high mutation rate in animal mtDNA make recognition of such modification, especially deletion, difficult. Studying the cases in which the presence–absence pattern of NUMTs does not agree with the phylogenetic tree, should make detection of recent NUMT losses possible by the means of using multiple genome alignments with the presence of an outgroup. Bensasson and his team members used this method to estimate the oldest inserted NUMT in human, which dated around 58 million years ago.

General characteristics of NUMT

As the number of mitochondria and their functional level differs across eukaryotic organisms, the length, structure, and sequence of NUMTs vary dramatically. Researchers have found that the recent NUMT insertions are derived from different segments of the mitochondrial genome, including the D-loop and, in some extreme cases, a number of, nearly, the full-length mitochondrial genome.  The sequence, frequency, size distribution, and even the difficulties of finding these sequences in the genome vary substantially among species. The majority of DNA fragments transferred from mitochondria and plastids into the nuclear genome are less than 1 kb in size. Yet, extremely large fragments of organelle DNA are found in some the plant genomes.

As the genome evolves and alters over time by mutation, the number of NUMT in the genome differs over the course of evolution. NUMT enters the nucleus and inserts in the nDNA at different stages of the time. Due to constant mutation and instability of NUMT, the resemblance of this genome stretch to the mtDNA varies widely across the kingdom Animalia and even within the certain genome. For instance, the latest number of NUMT recorded in the human genome is 755 fragments which range from 39 bp to almost the entire mitochondrial sequence in size. There are 33 paralogous sequences with over 80% sequence similarity and of a greater length than 500 bp. Moreover, not all the NUMT fragments in the genome are the result of mtDNA migration; some are the outcome of amplification after insertion. Old NUMTs are found to be more abundant in the human genome than the recent integrants, indicating that mtDNA can be amplified once inserted. Dayama et al. developed a high yield new technique for the exact detection of the number of NUMT in the human genome called dinumt. This method enables her and her team members to identify NUMT insertions, of all sizes, in the whole genomes sequenced using paired-end sequencing technology with a greater sensitivity. They applied dinumt to 999 individuals from the 1000 Genomes Project and Human Genome Diversity Project (HGDP) and conducted an updated enrichment analysis in humans using these polymorphic insertions. Further investigation and genotyping of the discovered NUMT also analyses age of insertion, origin, and sequence characteristics. Finally they assessed their potential impact on ongoing studies of mitochondrial heteroplasmy.

As previously mentioned, mtDNA is inserted into the nuclear genome only when a DSB is produced by endogenous or exogenous damaging factors. However, mtDNA is not inserted at any location within the genome. Moreover, there is no correlation between the fraction of noncoding DNA and NUMT abundance; In addition, Antunes and Ramos found that old NUMTs are inserted preferentially into the known and predicted loci, as inferred for recent NUMTs in the human genome, during their vigorous work on NUMT sequence in fishes using BLASTN analysis method. Therefore, based on these studies, the insertion of NUMT in nuclear genome is found to be non-random. One of the best studies proving the non-random distribution and insertion of NUMTs in the nuclear genome is done by Tsuji and his teammates. Using the LAST method instead of BLAST, which makes computing E-value with higher accuracy possible and does not under-represent the repetitive elements in NUMT flanks, Tsuji and his teammate became able to characterize the location of NUMT insertion precisely. They found out that NUMT fragments tend to be inserted in the regions with high local DNA curvature or bendability and high A+T rich oligomers, especially TAT. Moreover, NUMTs are mostly inserted into open chromatin regions. Using the same method, Tsuji showed that NUMTs are not usually clustered together and the NUMTs produced by D-loop are usually under-represented which evident more vividly in monkey and human compare to rats and mouse due to the total length of their NUMTs. However Tsuji also found that retrotransposon structure is highly enriched in NUMT flanks and most NUMTs are inserted in close proximity of retrotransposon while only a few, 10 out of 557 NUMTs, were inserted within a retrotransposon, they could not find any clear relation the size of non-coding DNA and the number of NUMT.

Consequences of de novo integration of NUMT inserts

NUMTs are not utterly functionless and certain functions are being associated with them. Although the insertion of NUMTs was previously considered functionless pseudogenes, recent human NUMTs are shown to be a potentially mutagenic process that could damage the functional integrity of the human genome. The accumulation of mutation in NUMT, post-insertional alteration, mutagenic mechanism of NUMT insertion, MMEJ and NHEJ, DSB, as well as the place in which insertion hot spot is located can cause mutation and dramatic alterations of the genome structure at the integration site, interfere with the function of the genome, and exert substantial effects on the expression of genetic information. Moreover, Integration of mtDNA sequences substantially affects the spatial organization of nDNA and may play an important role in the evolution of eukaryotic genomes. In addition to the negative effect of mtDNA, those conserved old NUMTs in the genome are likely to represent evolutionary successes and they should be considered as a potential evolutionary mechanism for the enhancement of genomic coding regions. Moreover, Chatre and Ricchetti with the utilization of Two-dimensional gel electrophoresis, plasmid construct, mutagenesis, in a sillico analysis of ACS motifs, and plasmid loss rate assay found that migratory mitochondrial DNAs can impact the replication of the nuclear region in which they are inserted. Through their functional evidence, they showed that sequences of mitochondrial origin promote nDNA replication in Saccharomyces cerevisiae . NUMTs are rich 11-bp ARS core-A consensus sequence (ACS), which its presence in the matches to these consensus motifs, in the Saccharomyces cerevisiae origin of replication, is necessary but not sufficient for the function of replication origin and any mutation in this consensus causes the reduction or loss of DNA replication activity. Given the high density of ACS motifs, some NUMTs appear essentially as ACS carriers. In contrast, replication efficiency is higher in those yeast strains that have plasmids containing both NUMT and ARS. They also found that some NUMTs can work as an independent replication fork and late chromosomal origins and NUMTs located close to or within ARS provide key sequence elements for replication. Thus, NUMTs can act as the independent origins, when inserted in an appropriate genomic context or affect the efficiency of pre-existing origins.

Disease and disorders 
NUMT insertion into the genome can be problematic. Transposition of NUMTs into genome has also been associated with human diseases. De novo integration of NUMT pseudogenes into the nuclear genome has an adverse effect in some cases, promoting various disorders and aging. MtDNA integration into coding genes in the germline cells has dramatic consequences for embryo development and, in many cases, is lethal. Few NUMT pseudogenes associated with diseases are found within exons or at the exon–intron boundaries of human genes. For example, the patients with mucolipidosis syndrome inherit a mutation caused by insertion of a 93bp fragment of mitochondrial ND5 into exon 2 of the R403C mucolipin gene. This is the first case of a heritable disorder due to the NUMT insert. Despite the small treatment group, Stem Cell transplant found to be effective and lysosomal enzyme levels seemed to normalize after transplant in at least one case. The Pallister–Hall syndrome, a developmental disorder, in another example, where a functional disorder of a key developmental gene results from a de novo insertion of a 72bp mtDNA fragment into GLI3 exon 14 in chromosome 7, which results in central and postaxial polydactyly, bifid epiglottis, imperforate anus, renal abnormalities including cystic malformations, renal hypoplasia, ectopic ureteral implantation, and pulmonary segmentation anomalies such as bilateral bilobed lungs. A splice site mutation in the human gene for plasma factor VII that causes severe plasma factor VII deficiency, bleeding disease, results from a 251-bp NUMT insertion. As the last known example, a 36-bp insertion in exon 9 of the USH1C gene associated with Usher syndrome type IC is the NUMT. No certain curse has yet found for Usher syndrome, however, a current clinical study on 18 volunteers is taking place to determine the influence of UshStat both in a short and a long-term period. This study has been started in September 2013 and is estimated to be done by October 2023.

Aging 
Several studies indicated that de novo appearance of NUMT pseudogenes in the genome of somatic cells may be of etiological importance for carcinogenesis and aging. To show the relation between aging and NUMT in the nuclear genome, Cheng and Ivessa used yme1-1 mutant strains of Saccharomyces Cerevisiae that have a higher rate of mtDNA migration. The method is exactly the same as the method Thorsness and Fox used to determine the important mechanisms and factors for mtDNA migration into the nucleus. They found out the yeast strains with elevated migration rates of mtDNA fragments to the nucleus showed accelerated chronological aging, whereas, strains with decreased mtDNA transfer rates to the nucleus exhibited an extended CLS, chronological life span  which could possibly be due to the effect of NUMT on nuclear processes including DNA replication, recombination, and repair as well as gene transcription. The effect of NUMT on the higher Eukaryotic organisms was investigated by Caro and his teammates in the rats as a model organism. Using a real-time PCR quantification, in situ hybridization of mtDNA to nDNA, and comparison of young and old rats, Caro and his crew not only could determine the high concentration of cytochrome oxidase III and 16S rRNA from mtDNA in both young and old rats, but they also could find out the increase in the number of mitochondrial sequences in nDNA as the rat gets older. Thus, based on these findings, mitochondria can be a major trigger of aging, but the final target could also be the nucleus.

Cancer 
The most dreadful impact of NUMT insertion happens when the mtDNA is inserted into the regulatory region or nuclear structural genes and disrupts or alters the vital cell processes. For instance, in primary low-grade brain neoplasms, fluorescent in situ hybridization analysis helped with the recognition of mtDNA localized in the nucleus in correlation with an overall increase in mtDNA content in the cell. This ontogenically early event is important in the etiology of these tumors. Similarly, in hepatoma cells mtDNA sequences are present in the nuclear genome at a higher copy number in contrast with the normal tissues. Another example would be HeLa nDNA that contains sequences which hybridize with mtDNA fragments of approximately 5 kb. An analysis showed that nDNA of malignant cells contains sequences of the mitochondrial cytochrome oxidase I, ND4 , ND4L , and 12S rRNA genes. Based on these findings, mtDNA fragments were assumed to act as a mobile genetic element in the initiation of carcinogenesis. Southern blotting is the method used to determine the frequency of mitochondrial insertion in nDNA of the normal and the tumor cells of mice and rats, which proved that the mtDNA sequences are far more numerous and abundant in nDNA of rodent tumor cells in comparison with normal cells. Using FISH probes, PCR and data sequencing, mapping and comparison, Ju and his teammate found that the mitochondrial-nuclear genome fusions occur at a similar rate per base pair of DNA as interchromosomal nuclear rearrangements, indicating the presence of a high frequency of contact between mitochondrial and nuclear DNA in some somatic cells. Also, Ju and his teammates investigated the timing of somatic mtDNA integration into the nuclear genome by assessing cases in which a metastatic sample had been sequenced in addition to the primary tumor. In some cases, mtDNA transfers into the nucleus in somatic cells are very frequent and can occur after neoplastic formation and during the course of subclonal evolution of cancer which suggest that this event occurs in the common ancestral cancer clones or in normal somatic cells prior to the neoplastic change. These findings demonstrated that the presence of direct correlation between NUMT and cancer in different body organs. Understanding the relation, the timing of the NUMT insertion, location of the insertion, and disrupted genes would help with producing more powerful and effective medicine.

Experimental uses and errors

Although understanding non-random insertion of NUMT and carrying out certain function after insertion, helps with revealing the structure and determining the complete function of the genome, especially human genome, NUMTs have been used as experimental tools and have been beneficial in different biological fields even before having any knowledge about the function of NUMTs. For instance, NUMTs can be used not only as genetic markers but also as a tool for understanding the relative rate of mutation in the nucleus and the mitochondria as well as recreating evolutionary trees. The continuing process of NUMT integration into the nuclear genome is evidenced by the finding of NUMTs that have been inserted into the human genome after the human–chimpanzee divergence. Some of these NUMTs are variable with respect to the genomic presence or absence, indicating that they have only arisen recently in the human population, permitting them to be used as genetic markers of lineage. Using a protocol based on genome alignment to estimate the number of NUMT in closely related species, Hazkani-Covo and Graur could not only identify evolutionary events that may have affected NUMT composition in each genome but could also reconstruct the NUMT makeup in the common ancestor of human and chimpanzee. NUMTs can be also used to compare the rate of nonfunctional nuclear sequence evolution to that of functional mtDNA and determine the rate of evolution by the rate of mutation accumulation along NUMT sequences over time. The least selectively constrained regions are the segments with the most divergence from the mitochondrial sequence. One of the most promising applications of NUMT study is its use in the study of nuclear mutation. In metazoans, NUMTs are considered non-functional. Therefore, nuclear mutations can be distinguished from mitochondrial changes and the study of nucleotide substitution, insertion, and deletion would be possible. Additionally, the homology of paralogous NUMT sequences with the mtDNA allows testing for local sequence effects on mutation. All these information obtained from the study of NUMT fragments could be used to understand mitochondrial evolution as well as evolutionary processes throughout the history.

NUMTs offer an opportunity to study ancient diversity of mitochondrial lineages and to discover prehistoric interspecies hybridization. Ancient hybridization have been first detected (using NUMTs) in bristletails, then in colobine monkeys, and, most recently, in a direct human ancestor. The hominid hybridization happened about the time of human/chimpanzee/gorilla separation. This latter study concerns a human NUMT shared with chimpanzee and gorilla. Joint phylogeny of the three NUMT sequences and the mitochondrial genomes of great apes implies that a common ancestor of the three NUMTs has been transferred to human/chimp/gorilla lineage from a hominid species separated from them by about 4.5 million years of mtDNA evolution. While hybridization of this magnitude is not unheard of among primates, its occurrence in the direct human lineage, around the critical time of human/ape speciation, is a startling result. Additional NUMTs with similar phylogenies indicate that such events may be not unique.

Another problem arose from the presence of NUMT in the genome associated with the hardship of concluding the exact number of mitochondrial insertions into the nDNA. Determining the exact number of NUMT pseudogenes for a species is difficult task for several reasons. One reason that makes detection of NUMT sequences more difficult is the alteration of these sequences by mutation and deletion.  Two further substantial obstacles make recognition of NUMT very difficult; first is the lack of correlation between the proportion of noncoding nDNA and the number of NUMT inserts in the nuclear genome. That is, NUMT insertion could occur in the known or predicted coding region, both intron and exon, rather than only in intergenic and intronic region.  Second, mitochondrial DNA integrated into animal nuclear genomes is primarily limited to animals with circular mitochondrial genomes without introns. NUMT studies are not available in animals with linear mitochondrial genomes or those with intron-containing mitochondria. Therefore, despite all the available advanced technologies, it remains to be determined whether NUMT transposition differences exist between circular and linear mtDNAs.

These difficulties to detect the presence of NUMT can be problematic. Translocated mitochondrial sequences in the nuclear genome have the potential to get amplified in addition to, or even instead of, the authentic target mtDNA sequence which can seriously confound population genetic and phylogenetic analyses since mtDNA has been widely used for population mapping, evolutionary and phylogenic studies, species identification by DNA barcode, diagnosis of various pathologies, and forensic medicine. This simultaneous amplification of NUMT with free extrachromosomal mtDNA, additionally, prevents one from determining the exact number of NUMT fragments in the genome of different organisms, such as Aedes aegypti mosquitoes, especially those in which extended translocation of mtDNA fragments occur. This makes the diagnosis of certain mitochondrial disorders challenging. For instance, a large NUMT pseudogene was found on chromosome 1, while more recent analysis of the same sequence led to a conclusion that sperm mtDNA has mutations that cause low sperm mobility. Another example would be the recent report describing a heteroplasmic mtDNA molecule containing five linked missense mutations dispersed over the contiguous mtDNA CO1 and CO2 genes in Alzheimer’s disease patients, however, the more recent studies using PCR, restriction endonuclease site variant assays, and phylogenic analysis proposed that the nuclear CO1 and CO2 sequences revealed that they diverged from modern human mtDNAs early in hominid evolution about 770,000 years before and these preserved NUMTs could cause Alzheimer's disease.  One of the possible ways of preventing from such erroneous result is an amplification and comparison of heterogeneous sequence, comprises both mtDNA and nDNA, with the obtained results from Sanger sequencing of purified and enriched mtDNA as shown in figure 4. Although this method is easy and only a few primers are required, it will prevent from a substantial error in phylogenetic studies of a population and all the previously mentioned false results.

See also
Human mitochondrial genetics
Mitochondrial DNA
CoRR Hypothesis

References

		 	

Mitochondrial genetics
DNA